The Sarrai Group of Companies, commonly referred to as the Sarrai Group, is a privately owned conglomerate in East Africa and Southern Africa. The group maintains its headquarters in Kampala, Uganda, with subsidiaries in Kenya and Malawi. The group is headed by the executive group chairman, Sarbjit Singh Rai

Overview
As of February 2022, the Sarrai Group comprises 10 subsidiary companies as outlined in the table below:

History
The father of Sarbjit Singh Rai, the current chairman of the group, migrated from his native India and established businesses in Kenya. The father's brother, one Tarlochan Singh Rai, who either came with him or followed him to Kenya, also established his own chain of businesses. After the two brothers died their sons expanded and diversified the businesses, which operate separately. Sarbjit Singh Rai moved to Uganda and started the Sarrai Group. His cousin Jaswant Rai, stayed in Kenya, where he operates three sugar plantations; (a) West Kenya Sugar Limited (b) Sukari Industries Limited and (c) Olepito Sugar Limited.

Controversy and Cancellation of Mumias Sugar Lease
In December 2021, the Sarrai Group controversially won a tender to lease Mumias Sugar Company Limited in neighboring Kenya. However, the announcement of the lease award was successfully challenged in Kenya high court leading to immediate suspension of the lease on December 29, 2021, by Justice Kenneth Ndung'u of Nairobi high court. The judge cited a petition by one of the bidders alleging fraud, mistakes and illegalities in the leasing process.

On 29 December 2021, the Kenya High Court in Nairobi, suspended the Mumias lease offer to Sarrai Group after one of the bidders filed a case against a lease award, with Sarrai group and Mumias Sugar receiver manager named as defendants. The bidder, Tumaz and Tumaz Enterprises, which had placed the highest bid of Kshs. 27.6 billion against Kshs. 11.5 billion for Sarrai Group, alleged fraud, mistakes and illegalities in the bidding process, which was headed by Kenya commercial bank (KCB)'s receivership manager P V Rao. Mumias Sugar was placed under receivership in 2018 by KCB, which was one of its creditors. Justice Kenneth Ndung'u of Milimani High Court in Nairobi suspended the lease award and ordered KCB's receiver manager and Sarrai Group not to interfere with Mumias Sugar until the case was heard and determined.

In January 2022, other bidders including West Kenya Sugar Company were enjoined in new cases filed against Sarrai Group and P V Rao. A group of Mumias sugar farmers filed another lawsuit challenging the lease award. They protested that KCB's receiver manager had erred in awarding the lease to the lowest bidder. West Kenya Sugar company told the court that it was the highest bidder, and yet the lease was awarded at a cost of Kshs. 5.8 billion to Sarrai Group. They contested that Sarrai Group was the lowest bidder out of 8 bidders who had submitted their bids. The Nairobi high court judge Okwany issued a second lease suspension until March 14, 2022,  when the case will heard and determined. The farmers had sued Sarrai group, P V Rao, the attorney general, competition authority,  Kakamega County government among others. In its reply to the suit, the Competition Authority of Kenya told the court that the lease award was fraudulent, because the KCB receiver manager and Sarrai group failed to get its approval before taking over the lease. They said it was a criminal act as per the Competition Act of the 2010 Kenyan Constitution.

In early February, 2022 another round of lawsuits were filed by creditors including the law firm of Kimeto, which is owed Kshs. 76 million. The law firm claimed that the leasing process was fraudulent because KCB's receiver manager had filed documents in court showing that KCB collected over Kshs. 1.5 billion from running Mumias Sugar since 2018. They argued that KCB's Mumias Sugar debt of Kshs. 570 million should already have been credited from the collections which were 3 times the debt KCB was owed. They wanted KCB receiver manager to be fired by the court and a new tender process to be announced and administered by the court. They argued that the previous tendering process had virtually collapsed after a barrage of lawsuits were filed, and effectively stopped the operations of Mumias Sugar.

In February 2022, 500 former employees of Mumias Sugar who occupied the company's houses claimed that they were served with eviction orders by Sarrai Group, despite court orders stopping the eviction without their salary compensation. Sarrai Group's eviction notices were in violation of court orders. These evictions echo of another controversy involving a Sarrai Group subsidiary in neighboring Uganda, in which Sarrai Group brutally evicted 5,000 people from their ancestral lands, prompting a Commission of Inquiry.

On April 14, 2022, the lease award was legally canceled by Justice Mabeya for failure to consider other creditors, for failure to consult the Competition Authority of Kenya, for failure to explain how Mumias would repay its creditors, and for failure to conduct a feasibility study. The Judge further demanded that the administrator step aside and give unrestricted access of Mumias to the newly appointed administrator, Mr. Kereto Marima. The new administrator is to “start the lease process afresh, in consultation with all the secured and unsecured creditors.”

See also

 List of conglomerates in Uganda
 List of conglomerates in Africa
 Kampala Capital City Authority
 List of wealthiest people in Uganda

References

External links
 

Sarrai Group
Companies established in 2000
Conglomerate companies of Uganda
Kampala District
2000 establishments in Uganda